= Jesus Hernando Gutierrez Mansilla =

Bolivian drug lord

- Born: Bolivia
- Died: November 2008; Asunción, Paraguay
- Occupation: Lawyer
- Criminal charges: Drug trafficking and smuggling

Jesus Hernando Gutierrez Mansilla (died November 2008) was a Bolivian lawyer and alleged cocaine trafficker.

== Biography ==
=== Criminal career ===
He was the son of Alfredo "Cutuchi" Gutierrez, a notorious drug lord. Commonly known as "Nando" he gained notoriety when he was arrested in 1993 for his alleged involvement in the Narco Statue case where authorities seized a large amount of cocaine concealed inside tiny statues that were to be exported. According to Gutiérrez, he was taken to a detention house immediately after his arrest where he was tortured by Bolivian FELCN and DEA agents. He was never convicted and was out on parole within a few years.

=== Death ===
In November 2008 Gutierrez was stabbed to death by an unknown assailant. The motives behind this murder are still unclear.
